Jamie Reader (born May 4, 1974) is a former American football fullback. He played for the San Francisco Demons and Philadelphia Eagles in 2001.

References

1974 births
Living people
American football fullbacks
Akron Zips football players
Scottish Claymores players
Philadelphia Eagles players
San Francisco Demons players